My Love Story is the second album by Linda Chung and was released on 12 November 2009. It consists of 12 tracks, of which 2 are Mandarin while the rest are Cantonese. It also contains an adaptation of the Bart Howard song, "Fly Me to the Moon". "I Heard You Love Me" is a remake of a song from the artist Sandy Lam.

Track listing

References 

2009 albums
Linda Chung albums